Živko Nikolić (Cyrillic: Живко Николић; 20 November 1941 – 17 August 2001) was a Yugoslav and Montenegrin film director.

Biography
Živko Nikolić was born in Ozrinići, Nikšić municipality in today's Montenegro, in 1941. He graduated the Art School in Herceg Novi where he was trained as a painter of ceramics which contributed to his specific perception of the film. He died on 17 August 2001 in Belgrade. His 1984 film Unseen Wonder was entered into the 14th Moscow International Film Festival where it won the Silver Prize.

Filmography
Sebi za života (1968) documentary short
Blaženi mirotvorci (1968) documentary short
Trag (1971) documentary short
Čačanski neimari (1971) documentary short
Ždrijelo (1972) documentary short
Polaznik (1973) documentary short
Bauk (1974) documentary short
Aerodrom Rijeka (1974) documentary short
Marko Perov (1975) documentary short
Prozor (1976) documentary short
Beštije (1977) ... aka Beasts
Oglav (1977)
Ine (1978)
Jovana Lukina (1979)
Krvava svadba na Brzavi (1980) (TV)
Ane (1980)
Graditelj (1980)
Biljeg (1981)
Smrt gospodina Goluže (1982) ... aka Smrť pána Golužu
Čudo neviđeno (1984) ... aka Unseen Wonder
Lepota poroka (1986) ... aka The Beauty of Vice
U ime naroda (1987) ... aka In the Name of the People
To ka' uvati ne pušta (1988) (TV)
"Đekna još nije umrla, a ka' će ne znamo" (1988) TV Series
Iskušavanje đavola (1989)
Ukleti brod (1990) ... aka Cursed Ship
"Oriđinali" (1995) (mini) TV Series
Uspavanka " (1995)
In Search of the Miraculous (1998)

References

External links
 

1941 births
2001 deaths
People from Nikšić
Montenegrin film directors
Burials in Montenegro